The Aggie Workshop is a historic former school building on  Marion County Road 5010 in Bruno, Arkansas. It is a single-story L-shaped structure, built out of local stone and topped by a hip roof with Craftsman-style exposed rafter tails. The WPA-approved building was built in 1935 by the Lincoln Aggie Club and was used as a vocational stone and cement workshop, as part of the local Bruno Agricultural School. A cement swimming pool, contemporaneous to the building's construction, is located in the crook of the L.

The building was listed on the National Register of Historic Places in 1992, at which time it was used for storage. It is located just north of Aggie Hall.

Lincoln Aggie Club 
The Lincoln Aggie Club was organized in 1923 by a local teacher. It later became a chapter of the Future Farmers of America, the oldest chapter in Arkansas and one of the oldest in the nation (Arkansas was the second state to get an FFA charter, after Virginia.). The members of the club built a workshop, Aggie Hall (a community recreation center), and Aggie Workshop.

See also
 Aggie Hall: 1926 Bruno Agricultural School gymnasium
 Bruno School Building: 1920 Bruno Agricultura School main building
 Hirst-Mathew Hall: 1929 Bruno Agricultural School classrooms
 National Register of Historic Places listings in Marion County, Arkansas

References

School buildings on the National Register of Historic Places in Arkansas
National Register of Historic Places in Marion County, Arkansas
Education in Marion County, Arkansas
1935 establishments in Arkansas
School buildings completed in 1935
Works Progress Administration in Arkansas
Vocational education in the United States
Bungalow architecture in Arkansas
American Craftsman architecture in Arkansas
National FFA Organization